Boswellia ameero is a species of flowering plant in the Burseraceae family. It is endemic to the island of Socotra in Yemen, common locally in arid, partly deciduous forests; however, populations are fragmentary, with aged, seldom regenerating trees being dominant. Also, the habitat of B. ameero may be degrading.

Flowers of B. ameero vary; in some populations they are bright pink, in others, pale pink.

Boswellia ameero is sometimes used for its resin.

References

External links
Original description of species in Latin, by Balfour (Proc. Roy. Soc. Edinburgh, v11: 505. 1882.)
Photos of Boswellia ameero, from Arkive.org

ameero
Endemic flora of Socotra
Threatened flora of Asia
Vulnerable plants
Plants described in 1882
Taxonomy articles created by Polbot
Taxa named by Isaac Bayley Balfour